Samuel Jones (20 January 1867 – 15 November 1944) was an English bowls international who competed at the British Empire Games.

Bowls career
He represented England in the 1938 British Empire Games at Sydney, in the pairs event and finished in fourth place with Ronald Weeks. In 1935 he won the Surrey county pairs title with C E Cramp bowling for Croydon Bowls Club.

Personal life
He was a plumber/builder by trade.

References

English male bowls players
Bowls players at the 1938 British Empire Games
1867 births
1944 deaths
Commonwealth Games competitors for England